Agrippina Nikitichna Krachun (born 1911) was a Soviet Moldavian politician.

She served as Deputy Chairperson of the Council of Ministers in 1955, Minister of Education in 1959–1961, and Secretary of the Presidium of the Supreme Soviet in 1961–1975.

References

20th-century Moldovan politicians
Communist Party of Moldavia politicians
Soviet women in politics
Women government ministers of Moldova
1911 births
20th-century Moldovan women politicians